WZRR (99.5 FM, "Talk 99.5") is a radio station licensed to Birmingham, Alabama. It carries a talk radio format, simulcast with AM sister station WAPI.  WZRR is one of several Birmingham-area radio stations owned by Cumulus Media, with radio studios and offices on Goodwin Crest Drive in Homewood.

WZRR and WAPI carry local talk shows during the day, but at night they run nationally syndicated shows from co-owned Westwood One including Mark Levin, Ben Shapiro, Dan Bongino, Red Eye Radio and First Light.  Most hours begin with world and national news from ABC News Radio. It is also Central Alabama's radio home of Auburn Tigers athletics.
 
WZRR's transmitter is west of Red Mountain, off Spaulding Ishkooda Road. It broadcasts using HD Radio technology.

History

Rock Station K-99
In December 1976, the station first signed on the air.  Its call sign was WVOK-FM, the sister station to WVOK (now WJOX).  "K-99", as the station was called, was Birmingham's first full-time progressive rock station. Previously, WJLN-FM (now WZZK) and WERC-FM (now WBPT) dabbled in that format on a part-time basis.

K-99 played an eclectic mix of rock songs from artists of the 1960s and 1970s, and was a ratings success. When WVOK-AM was sold to Mack Sanders in 1978, the call letters of the FM station were changed to WRKK, representing the word "Rock", but the "K-99" handle was retained. In 1981, WAPI-FM (now WJOX-FM) changed its format from easy listening to album rock, thus giving Birmingham two stations in the same format. This continued until the next year.

Country and Soft AC
In 1982, the new owners of WRKK changed the station's format to country music, and the station's branding was modified to "K-99 Country". Competing against market leader WZZK-FM, the new WRKK was not successful.

In an attempt to change K-99's fortunes, in 1984, the call letters were changed to WQUS, and the on-air name of the station was changed to "U.S. 99". Neither the new name nor the hiring of the popular Birmingham morning drive team of Tommy Charles and John Ed Willoughby improved the fortunes of the station.

In 1985, U.S. 99 dropped country music and flipped to soft adult contemporary, changed its call letters to WLTB, and rebranded as "Lite 99".

Classic rock
At 6:00 p.m. on Christmas Day, 1988, the 99.5 frequency became the new home of classic rock in Birmingham, with the new call letters of WZRR and the new on-air name "Rock 99". The first song was "All Right Now" by Free. The station remained with the classic rock format for just over 23 years. In 1995, the station began calling itself "Classic Rock 99.5". In 2002 and 2003, it was known as "99.5 the Buzzard". In 2003, the name was changed again, this time to "Rock 99.5", using basically the same logo as it did in the late 1980s. In 2010, the name was once again shortened to "Rock 99" and the slogan heard most often on the station was "Alabama's Best Rock".

In April 2010, the station added the locally originated "Mojo Morning Show." The rest of the on-air line-up included Lori Ray, Blazeman and Jason Mack. WZRR had been owned by Citadel Broadcasting. Citadel merged with Cumulus Media on September 16, 2011.

Switch to Top 40
On New Year's Day 2012, at Midnight, Cumulus fired the local on-air staff and flipped WZRR's long-running rock format to Top 40/CHR, branded as "99.5 The Vibe." The final song played on "Rock 99" was "Girls, Girls, Girls" by Mötley Crüe, while the first song played as "The Vibe" was "Party Rock Anthem" by LMFAO. Cumulus already had two similarly formatted and branded stations in addition to WZRR: in Kansas City on KCHZ ("95.7 The Vibe"), and in Toledo, Ohio on W264AK ("100.7 The Vibe"), which has since changed format. The "i" letter in the station's branding is similar to those of Cumulus' "i"-branded stations such as KLIF-FM ("i93") in Dallas/Fort Worth.

Nash Icon
On August 15, 2014, at Midnight, after playing Bang Bang by Jessie J, WZRR dropped its CHR - Top 40 format. It began stunting with the songs "Sweet Home Alabama" by Lynyrd Skynyrd and "All Summer Long" by Kid Rock on a loop, while running liners advising listeners to tune in at 3 PM that day. At that time, WZRR flipped to 1990s and 2000s country music, being one of the first stations to adopt Cumulus' new "Nash Icon" branding as 99.5 Nash Icon. The first song on "Nash Icon" was "Gone Country" by Alan Jackson.

Talk Radio Simulcast
On May 20, 2016, at 5 p.m., WZRR flipped to a hybrid Southern rock/Country format, branded as "99.5 The South". The first song on "The South" was "Southbound" by the Allman Brothers. The playlist included strictly artists from the Southern United States, with a focus on classic rock/adult alternative artists. However, "The South" was revealed to be merely a stunt, as just four days later, WZRR began simulcasting the talk radio format on co-owned WAPI. WZRR is now branded as the main station, under the moniker "Talk 99.5."

WZRR and WAPI joined a crowded talk field in the Birmingham radio market that already included WYDE/WYDE-FM and WERC/WERC-FM.  (WYDE-AM-FM have since switched to a Southern Gospel and Christian talk and teaching format.)

Along with the simulcast came a revamped lineup. On weekdays, Matt Murphy and long-time Cumulus news personality Valerie Vining host "Matt & Val" from 6-10 a.m. "News & Views with Tim & Dale" featuring WZRR news director Tim Melton and Huntsville Cumulus morning host Dale Jackson from 10 a.m.- Noon, "The Richard Dixon Show" airs from Noon-3 p.m., and "Leland Live" starring Leland Whaley is the last live-and-local program of the programming day, airing from 3-7 p.m.. Syndicated hosts Mark Levin, Ben Shapiro, Red Eye Radio, and First Light round out the weekday lineup.

Talk 99.5 also features an in-house local news team airing local newscasts weekdays at the top and bottom of each hour from 6:00 a.m. until 7:00 p.m. Morning news anchor Jason Lee hosts and reports from 6-10 a.m., news director Tim Melton takes over from noon-3 p.m., and David Sears rounds out evening drive time from 3-7 p.m.

See also
List of radio stations in Alabama

References

External links
 Thad Holt was a broadcaster who was instrumental in the expansion of FM radio in Alabama. His papers can be found at the University of Maryland Libraries
Tribute page to K-99 FM, the original station on 99.5 in Birmingham

ZRR
News and talk radio stations in the United States
Cumulus Media radio stations
Radio stations established in 1976
1976 establishments in Alabama